In sound recording, a talkback system is the intercom used in recording studios and production control rooms (PCRs) in television studios to enable personnel to communicate with people in the recording area or booth. While the control room can hear the person in the booth over the studio microphones, the person in the booth hears the control room over a PA, monitor speaker, in their headphones or interruptible feedback (IFB) earpiece. Take numbers, reference data, and sometimes count-ins or remarks are also "stamped" onto recordings through talkback, similar to a clapperboard. 

The audio quality of talkback systems is usually markedly lower than that of studio microphones and speakers, coming from a simple microphone (which may be omnidirectional or unidirectional) built or plugged into the audio mixer, and with its sound often compressed. Since talkback is usually edited out of master recordings, high fidelity isn't essential, and studios tend to cut budget corners when possible. Compression allows comments from around the control room to be audible.

Occasionally instructions and comments from talkback systems do appear in studio recordings, notably in records by The Beach Boys, The Beatles, Spoon, and Bob Dylan. They frequently turn up in bootleg or "sessions" records.

Recording
Telecommunications equipment
Broadcast engineering
Television terminology